His Supreme Moment is a 1925 American silent drama film with sequences filmed in Technicolor, starring Blanche Sweet and Ronald Colman, directed by George Fitzmaurice, and produced by Samuel Goldwyn. Anna May Wong has a small role as a harem girl appearing in a play. The film is now considered lost.

Plot
As described in a film magazine review, engineer John Douglas returns to New York City from South America seeking financial backing for a mine. He meets the stage star Carla King when he attends the theater with his friend Harry Avon and young heiress Sara Deeping. The heiress pledges to secretly provide financial backing for the mine. John is in love with Carla and wishes to marry her, but, afraid of love, she proposes that they return to South America and she pose as his "sister." He accepts his plan. After a year in South America, Carla becomes ill. Sara decides to visit Douglas, but when she finds Carla with him she obtains their promise to return to New York City. Their plan having failed, John and Carla return. In New York City Sara successfully intrigues John so that he believes he loves her. Carla finds that her mother is being starred in her play on Broadway and jealously arises between them. They become co-starred in another production. The mother finally realizes her wrong, and she sends for John. He becomes engaged to Carla when he discovers that she loves him. They then return to South America with independent financial backing.

Cast

See also
List of early color feature films
List of lost films

References

External links

His Supreme Moment at silentera
Still of Ronald Colman, Kathleen Myers, and Blanche Sweet in His Supreme Moment

1925 films
1925 drama films
1920s color films
1925 lost films
Silent American drama films
American silent feature films
Films based on British novels
Films directed by George Fitzmaurice
First National Pictures films
Lost American films
Samuel Goldwyn Productions films
Silent films in color
Lost drama films
1920s American films
1920s English-language films